The fourteenth season of American talent show competition series America's Got Talent was broadcast on NBC from May 28 to September 18, 2019. Following the previous season, Tyra Banks left the program to focus on other projects, leading to Terry Crews replacing her as host following his involvement on America's Got Talent: The Champions earlier that year. In addition, both Mel B and Heidi Klum also left the program, with their replacements as judges being Gabrielle Union and Julianne Hough. The guest judges for this season's Judge Cuts stage included Brad Paisley, Dwyane Wade, Ellie Kemper and Jay Leno. The semi-finals involved two additional guest judges, a first in the program's history, with Sean Hayes and Queen Latifah.

The fourteenth season was won by singer and pianist Kodi Lee, with choir Detroit Youth Choir finishing second, and stand-up comedian Ryan Niemiller placing third. During its broadcast, the season averaged around 9.12 million viewers.

Season overview 

Open auditions were held in late 2018, within New York City, Detroit, Knoxville, Tampa, Charlotte, San Antonio and Los Angeles. As with the previous year, the judges' auditions were held in March 2019, at the Pasadena Civic Auditorium in Los Angeles. The Judge Cuts stage of the competition included singer Brad Paisley, former basketball player Dwyane Wade, actress Ellie Kemper and host Jay Leno. Following the previous season, Tyra Banks left the program to focus on other television projects, announcing her decision in late December 2018. Due to her departure, Terry Crews became her replacement beginning in April 2019, after being popular with viewers as host of the first season of the spin-off series America's Got Talent: The Champions. In addition to the departure of Banks, two judges were replaced due to conflicting obligations in 2019. Mel B could not return since she was needed to headline the Spice Girls reunion tour that year, while Heidi Klum signed on to producing a new fashion competition series for Amazon and could not remain committed to AGT. Therefore, actress Gabrielle Union and dancer Julianne Hough were offered the role of judges, with the announcement of their predecessor's replacements being made at the same time as Crews in April 2019.

This season had a minor change to the format of the program, with the semi-finals featuring two guest judges. Their inclusion would only be for feedback on the performances of the semi-finalists, not for stopping a performance with a buzzer nor having any involvement with the judge votes. The judges recruited for this format in this season were Sean Hayes and Queen Latifah. Other than this change, an undisclosed issue forced the judges' vote to be suspended during first quarter-final's results. While the top six quarter-finalists voted for by the public were advanced, those placed 7th, 8th and 9th respectively faced only the online vote as a result.

Of the participants who auditioned for this season, thirty-six secured a place in the live quarter-finals, with twelve quarter-finalists in each one. Among these included: singer and pianist Kodi Lee, singer and rapper Joseph Allen, violinist Tyler Butler-Figueroa the Detroit Youth Choir, and singer Luke Islam, who had each received a Golden Buzzer from the main judges and host; singer and guitarist Sophie Pecora, acrobatic dance group V.Unbeatable, light-up dance group Light Balance Kids and opera singer Emanne Beasha, who had each received a Golden Buzzer from the guest judges; singer Ansley Burns, mentalists The Sentimentalists and aerialist Matthew Richardson, who were chosen as Wildcard quarter-finalists. About twenty-two quarter-finalists advanced and were split between the two semi-finals, including dog tricks act Lukas & Falco (chosen as the Wildcard semi-finalist), with ten semi-finalists securing a place in the finals. The following below lists the results of each participant's overall performance in this season:

 |  |  |  | 
 |  Wildcard Quarter-finalist |  Wildcard Semi-finalist
 Golden Buzzer - Auditions |  Golden Buzzer - Judge Cuts

  Ages denoted for a participant(s), pertain to their final performance for this season.
  The latter value denotes the age of the dog, as disclosed by its owner.

Quarter-finals summary
 Buzzed Out |  Judges' choice | 
 |  |

Quarter-final 1 (August 13) 
Guest Performers, Results Show: Shin Lim, Bianca Ryan, Brian King Joseph, and Sofie Dossi

  Due to an undisclosed technical issue, the judges' vote was not held for this quarter-final; the results pertain to the standard public vote for the top 6 quarter-finalist, and the online vote for the 7th favored by the public.

Quarter-final 2 (August 20) 
Guest Performer, Results Show: Susan Boyle

Quarter-final 3 (August 27) 
Guest Performers, Results Show: Celestia, and Deadly Games

  Due to the majority vote for Marcin Patrzalek, Hough's voting intention was not revealed.

Semi-finals summary
 Buzzed Out |  Judges' choice | 
 |  |

Semi-final 1 (September 3) 
Guest Performers, Results Show: Darci Lynne, and Preacher Lawson

  Sean Hayes was included with the judging panel for this semi-final, but could only provide feedback; he did not have anything to do with the judges' vote or buzzing semi-finalists.

Semi-final 2 (September 10) 
Guest Performers, Results Show: Tokio Myers & Stewart Copeland, and Piff the Magic Dragon

  Queen Latifah was included with the judging panel for this semi-final, but could only provide feedback; she did not have anything to do with the judges' vote or buzzing semi-finalists.
  Although Mandel's buzzer was pressed by Lukas & Falco during their performance, he admitted he would have done so himself regardless of their action.

Finals (September 17–18)
Guest Performers, Finale: Cher, and Lilly Singh

 |  |  | 

  Ndlovu Youth Choir & Detroit Youth Choir conducted two joint routines for their second performance, and thus shared the same guest performer for each.
  Abdul was not revealed until after the performance.
  Ryan Niemiller's second performance with Chris Jericho was pre-recorded before the finale.

Ratings

References

2019 American television seasons
America's Got Talent seasons